"Don't Say No Tonight" is a 1985 single by Eugene Wilde.  The single was his second number one on the R&B chart in the US, where it spent three weeks at the top spot. The single was his most successful on both the R&B and pop charts.

Chart positions

References

1985 songs
1985 singles
Songs written by Eugene Wilde